Elmore is a town in Elmore County, Alabama, United States. Although initially incorporated in 1906, it lapsed and was not reincorporated again until 1997. At the 2010 census the population was 1,262, up from 199 in 2000. It is part of the Montgomery Metropolitan Statistical Area.

Geography
Elmore is located in western Elmore County at  (32.542314, -86.315455). It is bordered to the west by Millbrook and to the south by Coosada. Alabama State Route 14 passes through the town, leading east  to Wetumpka and west  to Prattville.

Demographics

Note that community was listed on the 1880 U.S. Census as the unincorporated town of Elmore Station.

2000 census
At the 2000 census there were 199 people, 77 households, and 55 families in the town. The racial makeup of the town was 67.84% White, 27.64% Black or African American, 1.51% Native American, 2.01% from other races, and 1.01% from two or more races. 1.51% of the population were Hispanic or Latino of any race.
Of the 77 households 31.2% had children under the age of 18 living with them, 49.4% were married couples living together, 18.2% had a female householder with no husband present, and 27.3% were non-families. 23.4% of households were one person and 9.1% were one person aged 65 or older. The average household size was 2.58 and the average family size was 3.07.

The age distribution was 26.1% under the age of 18, 8.5% from 18 to 24, 32.7% from 25 to 44, 21.1% from 45 to 64, and 11.6% 65 or older. The median age was 34 years. For every 100 females, there were 89.5 males. For every 100 females age 18 and over, there were 98.6 males.

The median household income was $29,792 and the median family income  was $32,500. Males had a median income of $30,179 versus $23,333 for females. The per capita income for the town was $13,533. About 11.7% of families and 20.5% of the population were below the poverty line, including 15.0% of those under the age of eighteen and 31.0% of those sixty five or over.

2010 census
At the 2010 census there were 1,262 people, 423 households, and 331 families in the town. The racial makeup of the town was 64.3% White, 26.7% Black or African American, .1% Native American, 7.4% from other races, and 1.3% from two or more races. 8.8% of the population were Hispanic or Latino of any race.
Of the 423 households 43.7% had children under the age of 18 living with them, 49.4% were married couples living together, 21.5% had a female householder with no husband present, and 21.7% were non-families. 18.0% of households were one person and 4.5% were one person aged 65 or older. The average household size was 2.98 and the average family size was 3.34.

The age distribution was 32.6% under the age of 18, 11.4% from 18 to 24, 29.6% from 25 to 44, 18.5% from 45 to 64, and 7.8% 65 or older. The median age was 29.1 years. For every 100 females, there were 92.7 males. For every 100 females age 18 and over, there were 96.2 males.

The median household income was $33,295 and the median family income  was $36,354. Males had a median income of $37,667 versus $22,193 for females. The per capita income for the town was $17,139. About 20.7% of families and 20.3% of the population were below the poverty line, including 29.8% of those under the age of eighteen and 13.9% of those sixty five or over.

2020 census

As of the 2020 United States census, there were 1,280 people, 362 households, and 268 families residing in the town.

Education
It is in the Elmore County Public School System.

Private schools:
 Edgewood Academy

See also

References

External links

 Elmore County Economic Development Authority

Towns in Elmore County, Alabama
Towns in Alabama
Montgomery metropolitan area